Ocean Beach is a long beach of golden sand in the Hastings District of the Hawke's Bay Region, on the east coast of New Zealand. It lies between Cape Kidnappers to the north, and Waimarama Beach to the south. Ocean Beach has a small population, mainly of Māori ethnicity. Local Māori know it also as Waipuka. Visitors, mainly Hawke's Bay locals, enjoy it as a seaside recreational beach. Ocean Beach has few roads – only the road to it from Havelock North, and some others branching off to a few houses.

Ocean Beach has a strong rip current and usually has large strong waves and is therefore popular with surfers. The beach has surf life-saving patrols running all through summer. Behind the sandy beachfront are the Haupouri Flats, an area of farm pasture. The land behind that is very hilly and the one-way road going down to the beach is steep. A river formed by runoff from farmland flows onto the beach and creates features that vary often, from a river going straight into the sea, to a delta, a lake, or a lagoon. Sometimes beachgoers create canals from these lakes and rivers to the sea.

On 13 March 2006, leaked documents between Hastings District Mayor Lawrence Yule and a syndicate of developers that approved of over 500 houses and new roading to be built in Ocean Beach. The area mainly owned by Māori was to become a town and residents were outraged. There was a dispute between Hastings authorities and residents over the new constructions. Many developments have been proposed on the area dating back to 1995 and have been rejected by locals.

References

Hastings District
Populated places in the Hawke's Bay Region
Beaches of the Hawke's Bay Region